Kokoshnik is a semicircular or keel-like exterior decorative element in the Old Russian architecture, a type of corbel zakomara (that is an arch-like semicircular top of the church wall). Unlike zakomara that continues the curvature of the vault behind and carries a part of the vault's weight, kokoshnik is pure decoration and doesn't carry any weight. Kokoshnik shares its name with the traditional Russian headdress worn by women and girls. The word itself derives from the Old Slavic word kokosh, which refers to a hen or a cockerel.

Kokoshniks were used in the Russian church architecture from the 16th century, and they were especially popular in the 17th century. They were placed on walls, at the basement of tented roofs or tholobates, over the window frames, or in rows above the vaults.

Examples

External links 

 Kokoshnik (architecture) in the Great Soviet Encyclopedia

References

Architecture in Russia
Church architecture
Russian inventions
Architectural elements
Ornaments (architecture)